Al-Futuwwah (Arabic: قتوة - "The Youth" or "The Brotherhood") was the youth organisation of the Palestine Arab Party in Palestine. The organisation was created in February 1936 and was to some extent modelled on the Hitler Youth organisation in Germany. For a short time it was known as the "Nazi Scouts".

Origins
The Palestine Arab Party was founded at a congress in March 1935, when Jamal al-Husayni was elected President. One of the tasks pursued by the heads of the Party was to create a youth branch. This was actively pursued by the General Secretary Emil Ghuri, who at first tried to work through the Boy Scouts but that didn't succeed. Then a separate organisation was created, for a short time called the "Nazi Scouts" and then renamed it as al-Futuwwah.

At the founding meeting on February 11, 1936, Jamal al-Husayni noted that Hitler's followers had grown in number from six to sixty million and expressed the hope that al-Futuwwa would also be a nucleus of national resurrection. The following credo was adopted:Liberty is my right; independence is my goal; Arabism is my principle; Palestine is my country and mine only. This I attest and God is a witness to my words.

Later developments
Al-Futuwwa was broken up by the British in 1937 during the Arab Revolt. It was re-established in September 1946 and Kamil Arikat was made its commander.  Its main task was to support the leadership of Jamal al-Husseini by opposing al-Najjada. Its members wore uniforms and had superficial military training. Estimates of their strength range from 2,000 to 5.000. An official merger of al-Futuwwa and al-Najjada was announced later that year, but in practice they continued to operate separately. A more successful merger in 1947 apparently caused a decrease in paramilitary activity.

References 

Youth organizations established in 1936
Arab nationalism in Mandatory Palestine